The Louisiana Swashbucklers were a professional indoor football team based in Lake Charles, Louisiana.  They were formed in 2005 as an expansion member of the National Indoor Football League (NIFL) and were originally known as the Southwest Louisiana Swashbucklers.  They replaced another NIFL franchise, the Lake Charles Land Sharks.  In 2006, they moved to the Intense Football League (IFL) and shortened their name to Louisiana Swashbucklers. They were originally set to play in the Indoor Football League due to the IFL's merger with United Indoor Football, but later had to bow out over financial concerns.  For their next three seasons, they were a member of the new Southern Indoor Football League.  Later a member of the Professional Indoor Football League, they played their home games at Sudduth Coliseum in Lake Charles, Louisiana.  On May 24, 2013, the team announced that they would be ceasing operations due to low turnout and cancelled the team's final home game.

Final roster

Final roster

The last reported roster was on July 16, 2013.

All-league players
FB Kendrick Perry (2)
WR Jordan Rideaux (2)
OL Roman Pritt
DL John Paul Jones
DB Damian Huren (2)

Season-by-season results

External links
 Official website
 Southwest Louisiana Swashbucklers' 2005 stats
 Louisiana Swashbucklers' 2006 stats
 Louisiana Swashbucklers' 2007 stats
 Louisiana Swashbucklers' 2008 stats
 Louisiana Swashbucklers' 2009 stats
 Louisiana Swashbucklers' 2010 stats
 Louisiana Swashbucklers' 2011 stats

 
American football teams in Louisiana
2005 establishments in Louisiana
2013 disestablishments in Louisiana